Misaki Station is the name of two train stations in Japan:

 Misaki Station (Chiba) (三咲駅)
 Misaki Station (Hokkaido) (御崎駅)